B. balansae may refer to:
 Balanops balansae, a plant species endemic to New Caledonia
 Bromelia balansae, a plant species native to Argentina, Brazil and Paraguay

See also 
 Balansae